Juan Carlos "Arjo" Campo Atayde (born November 5, 1990) is a Filipino actor and politician who has served as the representative for Quezon City's 1st district since 2022. He is best known for his appearances on drama series aired on ABS-CBN, as well as his critically acclaimed role as Benjo in the web series Bagman. A member of the Nacionalista Party, Atayde was first elected to Congress as an independent in the 2022 general elections, where he unseated incumbent representative Onyx Crisologo.

Early life
Atayde was born on November 5, 1990, to actress Sylvia Sanchez and businessman Art Atayde. He is the eldest with three younger siblings: Ria, Gela, and Xavi. Arjo studied at La Salle Greenhills and later moved to Reedley International School.

Entertainment career
His first official venture into acting was at age 9 for Ang TV. However, he was pulled out of acting when it affected his schooling. Atayde's first notable appearance was more than a decade later, in 2012, for the show E-Boy as "Jepoy".

He has played several starring roles in the drama anthology series Maalaala Mo Kaya. He appeared in the episodes "Bangka", "Dos Por Dos", "Itlog", "Liham", "Marital Lies", "Sibuyan Siblings", and "Tsubibo". For his acting in the series, he won the following awards from PMPC Star Awards for Television: "Best Male New TV Personality" in 2012 for "Bangka" and Best Single Performance by an Actor in 2014 for his portrayal of a gay parent in "Dos Por Dos".

In 2013, he starred as Rafael de Lara in the daytime television series Dugong Buhay for which he won a PMPC Star Awards for Best Single Performance by an Actor.  He then went on to star in the Korean adaptation, Pure Love as Raymond de la Cruz/Ramon Esguerra. The following year, he was given his biggest role to date as the main antagonist Joaquin Tuazon on FPJ's Ang Probinsyano. He also won a PMPC Star Awards for Best Single Performance by an Actor for this role.

He continued to have various notable roles in 2019 for which he received many accolades. Most noteworthy are his portrayals of Benjo, a barber who falls into criminality, in the iWant TV exclusive show Bagman where he won Best Actor in Leading Role award during the 3rd Asian Academy Creative Awards, and then as Elai, a man with autism, in The General's Daughter. The latter brought him praise on social media, including the approval of Autism Society Philippines for his sensitive and nuanced representation of autism.

Political career

Congressional career (2022–present)
In 2022, Atayde ran for representative in Quezon City's 1st congressional district. He ran as an independent with the backing of the Joy Belmonte-led Serbisyo sa Bayan Party. He was elected with 66.85% of the vote, unseating incumbent Onyx Crisologo. He was sworn in on June 30, 2022.

On October 8, 2022, Atayde joined the Nacionalista Party, being sworn in by Fellow Representative Sandro Marcos (Ilocos Norte–1st).

Personal life 
In 2016, he was reportedly courting the actress, Jane Oineza, but it did not work out. Atayde then dated a member of GirlTrends, Sammie Rimando, until 2018.

In December 2018, there were rumors about Atayde dating Maine Mendoza. The actress only confirmed this months later through her blog prior to her birthday in March 2019. They got engaged on July 28, 2022.

Filmography

Television

Web series

Film

Awards and nominations

References

External links
 

1990 births
Living people
ABS-CBN personalities
De La Salle University alumni
Filipino male television actors
Independent politicians in the Philippines
Members of the House of Representatives of the Philippines from Quezon City
Star Magic personalities
Viva Artists Agency
Filipino actor-politicians